The 1986–87 season was the 41st season in FK Partizan's existence. This article shows player statistics and matches that the club played during the 1986–87 season.

Friendlies

Season overview
The 1986–87 Yugoslav First League title was awarded to FK Partizan, as the 6 points deduction that originally made Vardar Skopje champions, was declared invalid.

Players

Squad information
players (league matches/league goals):
Fahrudin Omerović (34/0) (goalkeeper)
Milko Đurovski (31/19)
Goran Stevanović (31/4)
Admir Smajić (31/3)
Srečko Katanec (30/3)
Vladimir Vermezović (29/1)
Nebojša Vučićević (28/7)
Fadil Vokrri (28/5)
Miodrag Bajović (27/2)
Miloš Đelmaš (26/7)
Bajro Župić (26/0)
Vlado Čapljić (24/1)
Isa Sadriu (18/0)
Goran Bogdanović (17/1)
Aleksandar Đorđević (16/2)
Milinko Pantić (15/3)
Slađan Šćepović (6/0)
Ljubomir Radanović (5/0)
Darko Milanič (4/0)
Miodrag Radović (4/0)
Darko Belojević

Competitions

Yugoslav First League

Matches

Yugoslav Cup

UEFA Cup

First round

See also
 List of FK Partizan seasons

References

External links
 Official website
 Partizanopedia 1986-87  (in Serbian)

FK Partizan seasons
Partizan
Yugoslav football championship-winning seasons